Baphomet is a goat-headed winged creature associated with occult symbols.

Baphomet may also refer to:

The Baphomet, a transgressive piece of experimental fiction by Pierre Klossowski
Sigil of Baphomet, the official insignia of the Church of Satan
Statue of Baphomet, a bronze sculpture commissioned by The Satanic Temple

Characters
Baphomet (comics), a Marvel Comics demon
Baphomet (Dungeons & Dragons), a demon lord in the Dungeons & Dragons role-playing game
Baphomet, an alias used by the DC comic book character Onomatopoeia in Batman: The Widening Gyre
Baphomet, a character in the 1988 novella Cabal by Clive Barker
Baphomet, a character in the 8-Bit Theater webcomic
Baphomet, a boss enemy in the 2002 video game Ragnarok Online
Baphomet, a boss enemy in the 2005 video game La-Mulana
Baphomet, an alias for a god in the comic book series The Wicked and The Divine

Music
Baphomet Records, a heavy metal record label started by Killjoy, later merged with Phil Anselmo's record label to become Baphomet/Housecore Records

Songs
"Baphomet", a 1980 song by Angel Witch from the 2000 re-issue of Angel Witch
"Baphomet", a song by Dark Fortress from Eidolon (2008)
"Baphomet", a song by Grave Digger from Knights of the Cross (1998)
"Baphomet", a song by Quicksand from Slip (1993)